Gracillaria japonica is a moth of the family Gracillariidae. It is known from the island of Honshu, the main island of Japan.

The wingspan is 9.8–13 mm.

The larvae feed on Ligustrum obtusifolium and Ligustrum tschonoskii. They mine the leaves of their host plant. Young larvae make a solitary tentiform mine on the lower surface of the food plant. The mine being quite similar to that in some Phyllonorycter species. In later instars, it leaves the mine, then rolls up the leaf from the tip towards the underside, thus making a triangular cone as in many Caloptilia species. The cocoon is usually placed on the surface of the leaf. It is boat-shaped and whitish. The species probably hibernates in the adult stage.

References

Gracillariinae
Moths of Japan
Moths described in 1982